Zieria bifida is a plant in the citrus family Rutaceae and is only known from two areas near Nambour in Queensland. It is an open, straggly shrub with hairy branches, three-part leaves and small, white flowers in small groups, each flower with four petals and four stamens.

Description
There are few forked hairs along the edges of the leaflets and on the midrib on the lower surface. Unlike some similar zierias, the leaf margins are thickened and flat.

The groups are about the same length or shorter than the leaves and usually only one to three flowers are open at the same time.

Taxonomy and naming
Zieria bifida was first formally described in 2007 by Marco Duretto and Paul Forster from a specimen collected in the Triunia National Park and the description was published in Austrobaileya. The species had previously been known as Zieria sp. "Brolga Park". The specific epithet (bifida) is a Latin word meaning "split into two parts", referring to the forked hairs on the branches and leaves.

Distribution and habitat
This zieria grows in the transition zone between rainforest and open forest. It is only known from Triunia National Park (previously known as "Brolga Park") and a second nearby area on private property.

Conservation
This zieria is listed as "Endangered" under the Queensland Nature Conservation Act 1992 and under the Commonwealth Government Environment Protection and Biodiversity Conservation Act 1999 (EPBC) Act. The main threats to its survival are invasion by Lantana camara, and inappropriate fire regimes.

References

External links
 

bifida
Sapindales of Australia
Flora of Queensland
Taxa named by Marco Duretto
Plants described in 2007
Taxa named by Paul Irwin Forster